NDUFA4, mitochondrial complex associated is a protein that in humans is encoded by the NDUFA4 gene. The NDUFA4 protein was first described to be a subunit of NADH dehydrogenase (ubiquinone), which is located in the mitochondrial inner membrane and is the largest of the five complexes of the electron transport chain. However, recent research has described NDUFA4 as a subunit of cytochrome c oxidase. Mutations in the NDUFA4 gene are associated with Leigh's syndrome.

Structure 
The NDUFA4 gene is located on the p arm of chromosome 7 at position 21.3 with a total length of 8,234 base pairs. The NDUFA4 gene produces a 9.4 kDa protein composed of 81 amino acids.

NDUFA4 has traditionally been defined as a subunit of the enzyme NADH dehydrogenase (ubiquinone) (Complex I), the largest of the respiratory complexes. 

More recent research has demonstrated that no perturbation of Complex I occurs upon NDUFA4 deletion, calling into question its role in this complex. It has been demonstrated that NDUFA4 plays a role in Complex IV function and biogenesis, however, with some authors suggesting that the NDUFA4 gene be renamed and the structure of both Complex I and Complex IV be re-evaluated.

Clinical significance 
Mutations in the NDUFA4 gene can result in Leigh's syndrome, a severe neurological disorder that typically arises in the first year of life. Disruption of Complex IV, also called cytochrome c oxidase or COX, is the most common cause of Leigh syndrome. Given that NDUFA4 has only recently been identified as a subunit of Complex IV rather than Complex I, patients with previously unexplained COX deficiencies could be genetically tested for NDUFA4 mutations.

Interactions 

NDUFA4 has many protein-protein interactions, including ubiquitin proteins such as ubiquitin C and UBL4A, as well as CUL3 and PARK7.

References

Further reading